El Paso, Texas, held a first round of general elections on May 6, 2017, to elect the mayor and city council. The run-off election  was June 10, 2017. Incumbent Mayor Oscar Leeser was eligible for another term, but announced in July 2016 he would not seek another term. Leeser had a cancer-related surgery in 2016, but stated that his decision was not because of his health. Instead, it was because he "ran to do things I thought were really important for our community and I did that."

The election was non-partisan; therefore there was no primary election. However, if no candidate won a majority there will be a run-off election.

The mayor and council members elected in 2017 will serve through December 2020. The term is shortened because of a charter amendment to move city elections from May in odd-numbered years to November in even-numbered years.

Dee Margo took first place in the mayoral race but did not win a majority of votes, so he and David Saucedo competed in a runoff election. Margo defeated Saucedo in the run-off election. 8.57% of registered voters voted in the run-off election, one of the lowest turnouts in the city's history.

Districts 2, 3, 4, 7, and 8 had elections in 2017. District 2 incumbent, Jim Tolbert, and District 7 incumbent, Lilia Limon, were eligible for re-election, but were defeated by Alexansandra Annello and Henry Rivera, respectively. Emma Acosta, District 3 incumbent, and Carl Robinson, District 4 incumbent, were term limited and could not run again; they were succeeded by Cassandra Hernandez and Sam Morgan, respectively. District 8 representative Cortney Niland, whose term was supposed to end in December 2018, resigned in April 2017. The city scheduled a June special election and July runoff election to fill the remainder of her term. The runoff election was won by Cissy Lizarraga.

Mayoral election

Candidates
 Emma Acosta (2008–present), city council representative
 Jorge Artalejo, perennial candidate
 Willie Cager, YISD basketball coach, director of the Willy Cager Foundation, and member of the 1966 UTEP Basketball team
 Dee Margo, former Republican member of the Texas House of Representatives
 Elisa Morales, health science researcher, medical device salesperson, Health Graduate Fellow for Congressman Beto O'Rourke and Senator Lamar Alexander, and legislative aide to Senator Tom Udall
 Jaime Perez, perennial candidate
 David Saucedo, owner of Saucedo Lock Company and former president of the board of direct of the Boys & Girls Club of El Paso
 Charles Stapler, member of the El Paso County Historical Commission board

Declined candidates
 Estela Casas, KVIA news anchor
 Oscar Leeser, incumbent mayor
 Cortney Niland, city council representative (2011–2017)
 Emma Schwartz, president and CEO of the Medical Center of the Americas Foundation
 Joe Wardy, former mayor of El Paso (2003-2005)

First round results

Runoff results

City council election

Candidates

District 2

Candidates
 Alexsandra Annello, student
 Dolores Baca, writer and housewife
 Jud Burgess, artist and activist
Alexander Burnside, veteran and Bernie Sanders activist
 Jim Tolbert, city council representative (2016–2017)
 Raul Valdez, UTEP teaching assistant

First round results

Runoff results

District 3

Candidates
 Jaime Barceleau, charitable executive director for the Paso del Norte Children's Development Center
 Elias Camacho, Vietnam War veteran, retired El Paso Police Department detective, private investigator, and substitute teacher
 Cassandra Hernandez-Brown, deputy director of Dynamic Workforce Solutions
 Louis Pellicano, retired person
 Antonio Williams, private practice immigration attorney, and State Democratic Executive Committeeman for Texas Senate District 29

Results

Runoff results

District 4

Candidates
 Shane Haggerty, retired firefighter and Ysleta Independent School District Board of Trustees president
 Sam Morgan, owner of El Paso Concealed Carry
 Jose Plasencia, Green Party activist, chess teacher 
 Diana Ramos, Socorro Independent School District instructional aide and former employee of Congressman Beto O'Rourke

Results

Runoff results

District 7

Candidates
 Lily Limon, city council representative (2013–2017)
 Henry Rivera, police officer

Results

District 8

Candidates
 Trini Acevedo, health unit coordinator at University Medical Center
 Robert Cormell, businessman
 Gilbert Guillen, retired businessman and anti-arena activist
 Cissy Lizarraga, retired teacher
 Adolfo Lopez, attorney

Results

Runoff results

References

External links
Campaign websites
 Dee Margo for Mayor
 David Saucedo for Mayor
 Elisa Morales for Mayor
 Jaime Perez for Mayor

El Paso
El Paso
El Paso
El Paso, Texas
El Paso 2017
2017
Non-partisan elections